The Word as Law is the second studio album by Californian band Neurosis. It was released in 1990 through Lookout! Records, originally on LP only. In 1991, the album was released on CD with several re-recorded tracks from previous releases as bonus material.

The Word as Law is the first Neurosis album to feature Steve Von Till and Simon McIlroy.

A different version of "Common Inconsistencies" is featured on the 1989 compilation The Thing That Ate Floyd.

Track listing
"Double-Edged Sword" – 4:05 (Music & Lyrics: Kelly)
"The Choice" – 4:07 (Music: Edwardson, Lyrics: Edwardson/Kelly)
"Obsequious Obsolescence" – 5:12 (Music: Kelly/Edwardson/Von Till, Lyrics: Kelly)
"To What End?" – 6:23 (Music & Lyrics: Von Till)
"Tomorrow's Reality" – 5:47 (Music & Lyrics: Edwardson)
"Common Inconsistencies" – 4:24 (Music: Edwardson, Lyrics: Edwardson/Kelly)
"Insensitivity" – 0:47 (Music & Lyrics: Edwardson)
"Blisters" – 7:18 (Music: Kelly/Edwardson, Lyrics: Kelly)

Bonus tracks
"Life on Your Knees" – 2:54 (Music: Edwardson, Lyrics: Kelly/Edwardson)
"Pain of Mind" – 3:10 (Music: Kelly/Edwardson, Lyrics: Kelly)
"Grey" – 3:01 (Music: Edwardson, Lyrics: Kelly)
"United Sheep" – 3:15 (Music & Lyrics: Kelly)
"Pollution" – 4:09 (Music & Lyrics: Kelly)
"Day of the Lords" - 5:17 (Joy Division cover)
"Untitled" – 10:41

Personnel 
 Scott Kelly − guitar, vocals
 Steve Von Till − guitar, vocals
 Dave Edwardson − bass guitar, vocals
 Simon McIlroy − keyboards, tapes, samples
 Jason Roeder − drums

References

1990 albums
Neurosis (band) albums